In signal processing, the energy   of a continuous-time signal x(t) is defined as the area under the squared magnitude of the considered signal i.e., mathematically

Unit of will be (unit of signal)2.

And the energy   of a discrete-time signal x(n) is defined mathematically as

Relationship to energy in physics

Energy in this context is not, strictly speaking, the same as the conventional notion of energy in physics and the other sciences.  The two concepts are, however, closely related, and it is possible to convert from one to the other:

where Z represents the magnitude, in appropriate units of measure, of the load driven by the signal.

For example, if x(t) represents the potential (in volts) of an electrical signal propagating across a transmission line, then Z would represent the characteristic impedance (in ohms) of the transmission line.  The units of measure for the signal energy  would appear as volt2·seconds, which is not dimensionally correct for energy in the sense of the physical sciences.  After dividing   by Z, however, the dimensions of E would become volt2·seconds per ohm,

which is equivalent to joules, the SI unit for energy as defined in the physical sciences.

Spectral energy density

Similarly, the spectral energy density of signal x(t) is

where X(f) is the Fourier transform of x(t).

For example, if x(t) represents the magnitude of the electric field component (in volts per meter) of an optical signal propagating through free space, then the dimensions of X(f) would become volt·seconds per meter and  would represent the signal's spectral energy density (in volts2·second2 per meter2) as a function of frequency f (in hertz).  Again, these units of measure are not dimensionally correct in the true sense of energy density as defined in physics.  Dividing  by Zo, the characteristic impedance of free space (in ohms), the dimensions become joule-seconds per meter2 or, equivalently, joules per meter2 per hertz, which is dimensionally correct in SI units for spectral energy density.

Parseval's theorem

As a consequence of Parseval's theorem, one can prove that the signal energy is always equal to the summation across all frequency components of the signal's spectral energy density.

See also
 Signal processing
 Parseval's theorem
 Spectral density
 Inner product

References

Signal processing